A zarih or ḍarīḥ is an ornate, usually gilded, lattice structure, that encloses a grave in a mosque or Islamic shrine.

Zarihs serve as a marker for the tombs of religious figures, and as a symbol of their sacred nature. Zarihs are funded by donations, it is considered a blessing to do so, according to the Shia. The construction and installation of zarihs are often done on a volunteer basis, made as a waqf with its creators demanding no pay for their work.

A zarih is built from fine materials by skilled craftsmen, calligraphers, metal workers, jewellers, carpenters, and engineers. Zarihs can be the size of a small room and are commonly built by hand in a process that often takes several years. Not all zarihs are of the same quality; however, the most intricate zarihs found, are often in the shrines of Shia Imams and are seldom built, these zarihs take longer to construct and use more sophisticated materials and methods.

The walls of a zarih are filled with verses from the Quran, names of holy figures and other religious artwork. Notable installations are found in the Imam Husayn Shrine, the Al Abbas Mosque, the Sayyidah Ruqayya Mosque , the Abdul Qadir Jilani Mosque, The Junaid Baghdadi with Sirri Saqti shrine and the Imam Ali Mosque.

See also 
 Islamic architecture
 Shia
 Sufi

References 

Islamic architectural elements
Mosque architecture
Safavid architecture
Shia shrines
Islamic terminology